Nong Chang is a district (amphoe) of Uthai Thani province, northern Thailand.

Geography
Neighboring districts are (from the southwest clockwise) Huai Khot, Lan Sak, Thap Than, Nong Khayang of Uthai Thani Province and Nong Mamong of Chai Nat province.

History
In 1917 the district was renamed from Uthai Kao (อุทัยเก่า) to Nong Chang.

Administration
The district is divided into 10 sub-districts (tambons), which are further subdivided into 96 villages (mubans). There are two sub-district municipalities (thesaban tambon) in the district: Khao Bang Kraek covers tambon Khao Bang Kraek, and Nong Chang covers parts of tambon Nong Chang and Nong Suang.

References

External links
 amphoe.com

Nong Chang